Langli Station was a railway station located at Langli in Ski, Norway. Established as a flag stop in 1928, it saw limited traffic, with only 15 daily boarding and disembarking passengers in 2008. It consisted of a simple wooden side platform and a shed. The station closed on 9 November 2012.

History
Langnes was established as a flag stop in 1928, when the Norwegian State Railways introduced flag stops at a large number of intersections along the Eastern Østfold Line in order to compete better with bus and truck services.

Due to the short platform, the Norwegian National Rail Administration was required by the Norwegian Railway Authority to either upgrade the platforms or close the station by 2019. The Rail Administration evaluated that the station had limited patronage and little possibilities of future growth as there were no plans for development within the catchment area. They therefore decided to close it and three other stations on the line. The closing took effect on 9 December 2012.

Facilities

The station was situated in an agricultural area with little population in the immediate vicinity. Access was available via a gravel road, with limited sign posting which made it difficult to find. There were about 80 people living and 10 jobs within a  radius of the station. There were 470 within . Most of the population within the catchment area lived at Ihlen. The station had 28 daily boarding and disembarking passengers in 2008.

References

Railway stations in Ski, Norway
Railway stations on the Østfold Line
Railway stations opened in 1928
Railway stations closed in 2012
1928 establishments in Norway
2012 disestablishments in Norway
Disused railway stations in Norway